Secrets of the Lone Wolf is a 1941 American crime film directed by Edward Dmytryk and starring Warren William. It is part of Columbia Pictures series of Lone Wolf films.

Cast
 Warren William as Michael Lanyard
 Ruth Ford as Helene de Leon
 Roger Clark as Paul Benoit
 Victor Jory as 'Dapper' Dan Streever
 Eric Blore as Jamison the Butler
 Thurston Hall as Inspector Crane
 Fred Kelsey as Detective Sergeant Wesley Dickens
 Victor Kilian as Colonel Costals
 Marlo Dwyer as 'Bubbles' Deegan
 Lester Sharpe as Deputy Duval (as Lester Scharff)
 Irving Mitchell as Mr. Evans, financier
 John Harmon as Uptown Bernie, alias Bernard the Steward
 Joe McGuinn as Bob McGarth, Private Detective

References

External links
 

1941 films
1941 crime films
American crime films
American black-and-white films
Films directed by Edward Dmytryk
Columbia Pictures films
The Lone Wolf films
1940s English-language films
1940s American films